This Right Here Is Buck 65 is a compilation album by Canadian hip hop musician Buck 65. It was released on V2 Records in 2005.

Critical reception

At Metacritic, which assigns a weighted average score out of 100 to reviews from mainstream critics, the album received an average score of 85, based on 14 reviews, indicating "universal acclaim".

Suzanne Ely of Entertainment Weekly gave the album a grade of "A−", commenting that "this oddly captivating country-rap hybrid of an album suggests we're entering a new frontier in hip-hop, with Buck as the foremost pioneer." Matthew Murphy of Pitchfork gave the album a 7.0 out of 10, writing, "though the album probably serves as an accurate snapshot of his headspace at one fixed point in time, the mercurial nature of Buck's talents have fated this to seem as yet another transitional work."

Track listing

Personnel
Credits adapted from liner notes.

 Buck 65 – vocals, turntables, production
 Andrew Glencross – keyboards
 Dale Murray – pedal steel guitar
 Charles Austin – guitar, instruments, production, recording, engineering, mixing
 Graeme Campbell – keyboards, sequencer, programming, effects, edits, production, recording, engineering, mixing
 Michael Catano – drums, recording assistance, engineering assistance
 J. LaPointe – mixing (9)
 Bernie Grundman – mastering

References

External links
 

Buck 65 albums
2004 compilation albums
V2 Records compilation albums